Eumictoxenus leleupi is a species of tephritid or fruit flies in the genus Eumictoxenus of the family Tephritidae.

References

Dacinae